Gabriela Jimeno Caldas (born 11 February 1990 in Bogotá, Colombia), known artistically as Ela Minus, is a Colombian singer-songwriter, multi-instrumentalist, and producer.

Biography

Early life and education 
Jimeno was born in the city of Bogotá. From the age of 12 to 18, Caldas was a drummer for Ratón Perez, a local hardcore rock band that toured Colombia. Her stint as a drummer allowed Caldas to gain considerable recognition in the national independent music scene.

Jimeno left Colombia at the age of 19 for the United States to attend the Berklee College of Music in Boston. Moved by the city's nightclub scene, she shifted to electronic music, double majoring in jazz drumming and music synthesis. She continued playing for bands during her studies, and after graduating, she worked on building and designing synthesizers at Critter & Guitari in New York.

Career 
Before she began her solo career under the name Ela Minus, Jimeno was part of punk band Balancer. She also accompanied bands like Dams of the West as a drummer on a number of tours.

From 2015 onwards, Jimeno released a number of extended plays independently, until 2020 when she signed with Domino Records and released acts of rebellion, her debut album. The LP was conceived entirely on analog machines (synthesizer, drum machine, sequencer, sampler) in Jimeno's home studio in Brooklyn. The Guardian described the album as "a record that shares messages of self-love and resilience that, embedded in her DIY approach, cut through with real resonance." It was largely praised by critics, and topped Radiónica's charts several times.

In September 2021, Jimeno performed at the Pitchfork Music Festival.

In February 2022, Jimeno began her North American tour. In April 2022, she performed at Coachella. Later in June, she played at Primavera Sound.

In January 2023, a US show was announced: she will play at the Cruel World Festival in Pasadena, California on May 20, 2023.

Personal life 
Jimeno is based in Brooklyn.

Style 
Jimeno's compositions can be categorized mainly as electronic. Virtually all of her work is done with analog synthesizers and drum machines. She sings in both English and Spanish.

Discography

Albums

EPs 
 First Words (self released, 2015)
 Grow (self released, 2016)
 Adapt (self released, 2017)

LPs 
 Acts of Rebellion (Domino Records, 2020).

Singles 

 "OK.../So" (2018)
 "they told us it was hard, but they were wrong" (Domino Records, 2020)
 "megapunk" (Domino Records, 2020)
 "el cielo no es de nadie" (Domino Records, 2020)
 "dominique" (Domino Records, 2020) 
 "Kiss U" ft. DJ Python (Domino Records, 2022)

References

External links 

 Official website
 Official Instagram
 Official Twitter

1990 births
Living people
Colombian singer-songwriters
Colombian producers